Billy Windle (1920-2011) was an English footballer, who played as a winger in the Football League for Chester.

References

 

1920 births
2011 deaths
Association football wingers
English footballers
Denaby United F.C. players
Leeds United F.C. players
Lincoln City F.C. players
Chester City F.C. players
Caernarfon Town F.C. players
English Football League players